Euverte d'Orléans or St. Euverte (died September 7 in Orléans) also known as Evurtius, Evortius or Eortius, was the fourth Bishop of Orléans in the 4th  century. He participated in the Council of Valencia in 374. The first Life of Saint Aignan, written between 474 and 530, is the oldest text attributing the construction of a Saint Euverte cathedral at Orléans. The exact date of his death is not known. Only the day (September 7), was transmitted by martyrologies in order to celebrate its anniversary. The name of his immediate successor is not known either.

Butler's account

The hagiographer Alban Butler (1710–1773) wrote in his Lives of the Fathers, Martyrs, and Other Principal Saints under September 7,

Citation

Bibliography

Christian saints
4th-century Christian saints